is a 1996 weapon-based 3D fighting game released by Capcom for the PlayStation-based ZN-1 arcade hardware. It was Capcom's first in-house polygonal fighting game (the earlier Battle Arena Toshinden 2 was licensed to Capcom from an outside developer). A PlayStation port was released in October 1996. It was followed by a single sequel, Plasma Sword: Nightmare of Bilstein, in 1998.

Gameplay
Instead of the six-button configuration system seen in past Capcom fighting game series such as Street Fighter II: The World Warrior and Darkstalkers, Star Gladiator utilizes a Soulcalibur series-esque four-button configuration system, which consists of two attack buttons for a character's weapon, a kick attack, and a guard defense. The fighters battle upon a hovering arena, and if a fighter is knocked off the arena they lose the round.

Plasma Reverses are two special guard moves that can be unleashed at any time from within a battle. A Plasma Reflect enables a fighter to deflect an opponent's incoming move and stun them, leaving them vulnerable for a few seconds, while a Plasma Revenge enables a fighter to counterattack an opponent's incoming move and strike back with their own fast attack. Characters can also use a Plasma Strike, which can cause huge damage to an opponent if it connects on sight, but a Plasma Strike can only be done once per round.

Star Gladiator also introduces the Plasma Combo System. Through a specific string of attacks, a fighter can combo their opponent even if the opponent is blocking. If a character strings together five hits and presses a specific button at the end of the combo, they initiate a Plasma Final, which unlocks a technique that inflicts a large amount of damage upon their opponent if used. This system was discarded in the game's sequel, Plasma Sword.

The arcade mode of Star Gladiator consists of ten fights. Depending on who the player chooses as their character, they will fight against a specific set of opponents. Gore, who serves as the sub-boss of the game is always fought at Stage 9 and Bilstein, who serves as the final boss of the game is always fought at Stage 10. Depending on how quickly the player defeats Bilstein, either the game ends with a false ending or the player is then taken to a special battle against an unplayable computer-controlled true final boss named Ghost Bilstein. Losing to Ghost Bilstein results in both a bad ending and a game over while defeating Ghost Bilstein results in the chosen character's own true ending.

Story
In the year 2348, humans have been exploring the vast reaches of outer space for four centuries and have established peaceful contact with various alien civilizations. People now emigrate from one planet to another. However, some problems arise with a couple of alien races, so the Earth Federation begins developing a Plasma-power weapon to protect the Earth from any outside threats. Dr. Edward Bilstein, a Nobel Prize-winning German-American physicist for the Earth Federation, uncovers the secret to humanity's "sixth sense": a technique for capturing the energy of the human mind, an energy source he calls "Plasma Power". The Plasma weapon is built, and Bilstein gains fame and fortune for the invention. It is discovered by the Earth Federation that Bilstein experimented on actual human bodies during his research on Plasma Power. He is arrested and exiled from Earth, imprisoned in a satellite that orbits the Planet Zeta, while development of the Plasma weapon is indefinitely suspended. Word of Earth's possession of a super weapon spreads throughout the universe and it reduces hostile confrontations.

Four years later, an Earth Federation army base is attacked and destroyed by a small group of rebels calling themselves the "Fourth Empire". Bilstein, who has built himself a powerful cyborg body and escaped from Zeta, is their leader. Realizing their pattern of attacks is leading back to Earth, a panicked Earth Federation searches for people who can utilize Plasma Power in their own given accord and stop Bilstein before he can conquer the universe with his nascent Fourth Empire. All of Earth's hopes rest in the project codenamed "Star Gladiator".

Characters
 Hayato Kanzaki: The main protagonist of the series. A rebellious young Japanese intergalactic bounty hunter who fights with a Plasma Sword while living on his own and caring about others, especially the children living in the orphanage in which he was raised from and his close friends June, Saturn, and Gamof. Hayato's noble love and determination for his friends is the driving force that prompts him to go up against Bilstein and the Fourth Empire. His alternate evil-self known as Black Hayato is originally his alternate costume prior to becoming a separate character in later appearances. Hayato is the only character in the series to crossover in another Capcom game; in this case, Marvel vs. Capcom 2. Hayato also makes a cameo appearance in Tekkaman Blade's ending in Tatsunoko vs. Capcom: Ultimate All-Stars, while Black Hayato appears as a boss unit in the tactical RPG Project X Zone 2. Voiced by Nobutoshi Canna in the series proper, and by Toshiyuki Morikawa in Marvel vs Capcom 2.
June Lin Milliam: A talented young British-Chinese rhythmic gymnast who fights with a Plasma Ring to avenge the death of her parents by Bilstein (she is unaware that her father is in fact Rimgal). After Bilstein's defeat, June feels that she has nothing else to live for and tries to commit suicide, but Hayato stops her and reminds June that he and the rest of their friends care very much for her. After this, June is determined to spend the rest of her life in peace and happiness with Hayato and the others. June makes cameo appearances in two of the background stages in Super Gem Fighter Mini Mix, the Shanghai stage in Capcom vs. SNK 2, one of Hayato's win poses in Marvel vs. Capcom 2, Hawkeye's ending in Ultimate Marvel vs. Capcom 3 as a member of the new West Coast Avengers, and Deadpool's ending from the same game. Voiced by Megumi Ogata. She also appears as a playable solo unit in the tactical RPG Project X Zone 2. She was also the first Star Gladiator character to be confirmed for the series.
Saturn Dyer: A green-skinned cone-headed alien who is named after the planet where he comes from in the Andromeda Galaxy of the universe (but not the one present in Earth's Solar System), he fights with Plasma Yo-Yos while having quite an eccentric yet friendly personality. Saturn is a well-known and renowned popular street performer on his home planet, with a clown-like attitude and a perennial ten-mile-wide smile on his face. Upon coming to Earth in order to enjoy his hobby of theater while on a new assignment to research life on Earth, Saturn learns about the threat of the Fourth Empire and joins the Star Gladiator project in order to help protect both Earth and his home planet. Saturn makes a cameo appearance in one of Hayato's win poses in Marvel vs. Capcom 2.
Gamof Gohgry: A brown-furred ape-like alien who comes from the forest planet of De Rosa which lies from within the Andromeda Galaxy of the universe, he fights with a Plasma Axe. When Gamof's job as a lumberjack is compromised at the hand of an unknown Earth microbe virus that destroys nearly all of De Rosa's forests, he becomes a reluctant bounty hunter and eventually meets up with Hayato, becoming good friends with him. When Gamof learns about the threat of the Fourth Empire, he joins the Star Gladiator project along with Hayato so that he can protect both his home planet and his family. Voiced by Daisuke Gōri.
Franco Gerelt: A renowned and honorable Spanish matador, he is an expert fencer and fights with a Plasma Rapier. Seeing the strong potential that Gerelt has from within his fighting skills, Bilstein kidnapped Gerelt's wife and daughter with the help of a rival matador who had envied Gerelt's popularity and skill and coerced Gerelt to follow his command. Bilstein also implanted a bomb in his chest which would be triggered if he disobeys. Voiced by Hisao Egawa.
Vector: An emotionless prototype assassin robot created by Bilstein to be the ultimate killing weapon. It fights with a Plasma Gun. Vector's only directive is to seek and destroy every single human being. Vector makes a cameo appearance in Roll's ending in Tatsunoko vs. Capcom: Ultimate All-Stars. Voiced by Osamu Hosoi.
Rimgal: June's father, the former English scientist Michael Milliam turned into a Velociraptor dinosaur who fights with a Bone Club after Bilstein experimented on him. Rimgal fights to try and control his transformation. However, Rimgal ultimately fails, and fearing his primal instincts will overtake his human sensitivity and end up having him kill his daughter, Rimgal kills himself in the end. Rimgal is the only regular character not to return in Plasma Sword: Nightmare of Bilstein (along with Kappah, a secret character). He does not have a voice actor but his roars are provided by Michio Sakurai.
Zelkin Fiskekrogen: A blue-feathered bird-like humanoid alien from the Planet Klondike, which lies from within the Andromeda Galaxy of the universe. He fights with a Plasma Claw. Zelkin, who is known for being a brave and noble valiant warrior, fights alongside Bilstein because of his loathing of humans, who nearly destroyed his race during a war. Zelkin is an old acquaintance of Hayato. Voiced by Hisao Egawa.
Gore Gajah: A big-brained pointy-eared tanned Indonesian who fights with a Plasma Mace. Gore, a genius magician, seeks to gain knowledge about Plasma Wizardry and joins Bilstein's Fourth Empire in order to advance his studies into Plasma Power. According to Japanese materials, Gore's alien-esque appearance is due to the side effects of the constant abuse of Plasma Wizardry, which had deformed him into his current state.
Dr. Edward Bilstein: The main antagonist of the series. A Nobel Prize-winning German-American prestigious physicist and cybernetic mad scientist emperor who fights with a Plasma Broadsword. Bilstein stumbled upon a research document left behind by one of his ancestors. It described Plasma Power and how it could be derived from human emotions. After escaping his prison and forming his "Fourth Empire" organization while placing himself in a powerful cyborg body, Bilstein seeks to conquer the entire universe and establish a new order. This form of Bilstein, who would later be known as "Ghost Bilstein", makes a cameo appearance in Tekkaman Blade's ending in Tatsunoko vs. Capcom: Ultimate All-Stars. Voiced by Daisuke Gōri.
Kappah Nosuke: A green-skinned turtle-like humanoid alien from the Planet Kappa, which lies within the Cygnus Galaxy of the universe. He fights with a Plasma Spear. Kappah is based on a Kappa, a type of water sprite that inhabits various ponds and rivers throughout most of Japan. Kappah and his race have a militaristic lifestyle; all of them despise peace and friendship, living only for war and fighting. This leads him to join Bilstein and the Fourth Empire, who promise to defend his home planet from any outside threats. Kappah plays very similar to Gerelt barring a few specials, although the characters are in no way related. Also, Kappah does not have a character select screen portrait in favor of a zucchini pair image. A sub-boss and secret character. Voiced by Kazumi Tanaka.
Blood Barbarians: A robust young American expert swordsman who fights with a Plasma Broadsword. Blood was taken in by Bilstein at a very young age after Bilstein himself had killed Blood's parents; Blood had the highest amount of Plasma Power stored in his body, and Bilstein wanted to use his potential on his Plasma Power research. Blood plays similarly to Bilstein, barring a few specials. A sub-boss and secret character.
Super Bilstein: Bilstein's greater form and the true final boss of the game.

Development
In an interview with Destructoid.com, Capcom's former senior manager of community Seth Killian mentioned that Star Gladiator was "supposed to have been" a Star Wars game.<ref name="Destructoid">{{cite podcast |url=http://www.destructoid.com/bit-transmission-episode-6-with-capcom-s-seth-killian-172324.phtml |title=Bit Transmission Podcast, Episode 06 |website=Destructoid |publisher= |host=Conrad Zimmerman |date=April 28, 2020 |time=56:05 |access-date=April 10, 2021}}</ref>

Reception

In Japan, Game Machine listed Star Gladiator on their September 1, 1996 issue as being the sixteenth most-successful arcade game of the month. A Next Generation reviewer called Star Gladiator "a quirky, stylish game that is more subtle than obvious, with innovative gameplay and likeable character design." He especially praised the ability to move, attack, and defend in three dimensions, and the "intuitive and simple" controls for executing these moves. GamePro approved of the game's graphical effects, unique combo system, and characters, and deemed it a satisfying first foray into 3D for Capcom.

The PlayStation conversion also received positive reviews, with critics almost universally praising the characters and the variety of their fighting techniques, as well as the game's graphics, particularly the 3-D animated backgrounds. The most common criticism was that the game is too easy in single-player mode. GamePro said that Star Gladiators "visual appeal and outstanding control will put other 3D games on their backs." Next Generation was more moderate, saying that Star Gladiator "is a pretty good game all on its own", but is more of a harbinger of the more outstanding 3D fighting games they anticipated Capcom would put out in the near future. GameSpot assessed that "All in all, the surreal alien characters, weapon-based fighting, and overall quality make Star Gladiator yet another peal of the thunder in the resounding Capcom storm."

The PlayStation version of Star Gladiator held an aggregate score of 82% on GameRankings based on five reviews.

 See also 
 Plasma Sword: Nightmare of Bilstein''

References

External links
Star Gladiator at MobyGames

1996 video games
3D fighting games
Arcade video games
Capcom franchises
Capcom games
PlayStation (console) games
PlayStation Network games
Science fiction video games
Fighting games
Video games developed in Japan
Video games set in the 24th century
Video games set on fictional planets